Athyrium otophorum, the eared lady fern, is a species of fern in the family Athyriaceae, native to Japan and east Asia. The triangular fronds open pale green before turning grey-green with maroon stems.   
Hardy down to  it is suitable for cultivation in any moist, partially-shaded spot with good drainage.

In cultivation in the UK, this plant has gained the Royal Horticultural Society’s Award of Garden Merit, as has the variety A. otophorum var. okanum.

References

Athyrium